The British School of Jakarta (BSJ) is an independent school in Pondok Aren, South Tangerang in Greater Jakarta, Indonesia. The British School of Jakarta is an international member of the Headmasters' and Headmistresses' Conference. It was established in Jakarta in 1973 under the auspices of the British Embassy. The main campus was relocated to Bintaro in 1994 to accommodate increasing numbers of students, and an early years centre was opened in Pondok Indah in 1999. The school offers classes for students from pre-school to year 13 based on a British curriculum, with the final two years covered by the International Baccalaureate diploma program.

The school was enforced to change its name from 'British International School' to 'British School Jakarta' in 2014 to correspond to the Indonesian government's regulations on prohibiting the use of the word 'international' in school names.

History

The British School was first established in Jakarta in 1973 under the auspices of The British Embassy. In 1975 the committee of parents responsible for the School approached a group of British businessmen for the purpose of setting up an enlarged facility in specially-built premises in Permata Hijau. In 1976, The British School was established as a Yayasan or Foundation, in keeping with the laws of Indonesia. In the early 1980s the school was renamed The British International School under Queen Elizabeth II's command.

In 1989, Diana Frances Spencer, otherwise known as Princess Diana of Wales, visited BSJ.

In 1990, when there was much pressure for spaces in the school, market research surveys and feasibility studies led to the decision to find a new site on which to build a new school for an enlarged intake and an extended age range - what became known as the Relocation Project. That Project reached its climax in the school year 1993-94 when the Permata Hijau site was closed and the School took over its new facilities on a  site in Bintaro, southwest of Jakarta. The new BIS was officially opened by Prince Edward in March 1994, and the first full stage of the project completed in the summer of 1994.

Campus Phase Two, which started in 1997, included the addition of the Cafeteria, the Art and Technology Block in the Secondary School and several smaller projects to improve and develop the campus. In 1999
the school opened a new Early Years Education Centre in Pondok Indah in response to growing demand for places in Pre-School and Reception classes. In February 2007 a new Performing Arts centre, the BIS World Theatre, was opened providing facilities and three performance areas. The Theatre was officially opened by the Duke of York, Prince Andrew, on 6 March 2008.

In early 2009, the construction of the Secondary Library Building was completed, which houses a cafe, school shop, meeting rooms and additional class room spaces. Extra land was purchased at the Bintaro campus and the School's Strategic Development Plan provides a framework for the future. An extension to the IB Centre to accommodate growing demand was completed in December 2009. In 2012 the Early Years Centre was comprehensively refurbished and reopened. In 2014 the school name changed to British School Jakarta to comply with new Indonesian law. In 2015 construction of the New Sports Hall commenced as part of the development of the East Campus.

In 2015, BSJ was awarded the TES British International School of the Year.

Campuses
The school is set in a fourteen hectare campus in Perigi Lama, Bintaro.

A pre-school campus in Pondok Indah has been closed and all equipment moved to the Bintaro campus.

Notable alumni
 	
 Maudy Ayunda, Singer-Songwriter, graduated 2013
 Frederika Alexis Cull, beauty pageant titleholder who won Puteri Indonesia 2019
 Elkan Baggott, Indonesian football player
 Sherina Munaf Indonesian Singer-Songwriter

References

External links

Alumni website

International schools in Greater Jakarta
Member schools of the Headmasters' and Headmistresses' Conference
Schools in Banten
Jakarta
Educational institutions established in 1973
1973 establishments in Indonesia